The Orb's Adventures Beyond the Ultraworld: Patterns and Textures is a 1992 (see 1992 in music) video by the UK electronic music collective The Orb. It was filmed and recorded at a live performance at Brixton Fridge, London, 12 May 1991.

A limited edition of the original UK VHS tape release came with a bonus CD (catalogue number ORBFREECD1) of the soundtrack. The soundtrack was also included as a bonus disk on a limited edition of the initial UK vinyl pressings of U.F.Orb.

Track listing
"Little Fluffy Clouds" (Alex Paterson, Martin Glover)
"Earth (Gaia)" (Paterson, Kris Weston)
"Towers of Dub" (Patterson, Weston, Thomas Fehlmann)
"Perpetual Dawn" (Paterson, E. Maiden)
"Star 6 & 7 8 9" (Paterson, T. Green, H. Vickers)
"Outlands" (Paterson, Fehlmann)
"Outro" (Patterson, Weston)

Credits

The Orb
 Alex Paterson - turntables, samples, programming
 Kris Weston (Thrash) - drums
 Nick Burton - engineering

Additional musicians
 Steve Hillage - guitars

Production
 Marion Waldorf - director
 Simon Maxwell - producer
 Recorded at the Brixton Fridge, London, Sunday 12 May 1991
 Remixed April 1992

The Orb albums
1992 video albums
1992 live albums
Ambient house albums
Live video albums